Mount Joern is a ridgelike mountain,  high, standing  northwest of Mount Bower in the Outback Nunataks in Antarctica. It was mapped by the United States Geological Survey from surveys and U.S. Navy air photos, 1959–64, and was named by the Advisory Committee on Antarctic Names for Albert T. Joern, a researcher in physiopsychology with the winter party at South Pole Station in 1968. The topographical feature lies situated on the Pennell Coast, a portion of Antarctica lying between Cape Williams and Cape Adare.

References

Mountains of Victoria Land
Pennell Coast